The Law Comes to Gunsight is a 1947 American Western film directed by Lambert Hillyer and starring Johnny Mack Brown, Raymond Hatton and Reno Browne.

Cast
 Johnny Mack Brown as Johnny Macklin 
 Raymond Hatton as Reno 
 Reno Browne as Judy Hartley
 Lanny Rees as Bud Hartley 
 William Ruhl as Brad Foster 
 Zon Murray as Drago - Henchman 
 Frank LaRue as Mayor Jim Blaine 
 Ernie Adams as Bert Simpson 
 Kermit Maynard as Jim - Blacksmith 
 Ted Adams as Ben Prescott 
 Gary Garrett as Blackie - Henchman 
 Lee Roberts as Pecos 
 Willard W. Willingham as Henchman

References

Bibliography
 Martin, Len D. The Allied Artists Checklist: The Feature Films and Short Subjects of Allied Artists Pictures Corporation, 1947-1978. McFarland & Company, 1993.

External links
 

1947 films
1947 Western (genre) films
American Western (genre) films
Films directed by Lambert Hillyer
Monogram Pictures films
American black-and-white films
1940s English-language films
1940s American films